Bawtry railway station was situated to the east of the town of Bawtry, South Yorkshire, England on the Great Northern Railway main line between Retford and Doncaster.

History 
The lengthy platforms were situated to the north of the long, low viaduct, the main buildings being on the town (down) side of the line. A signal box was provided on the north end of the London-bound platform. The station was unique in its structures, these being highly individual. The main building had a small portico leading to the booking office at the front with all the usual facilities within the building. Platform shelters were in wood in typical style of the GNR.

In the first half of the 20th century the royal family customarily attended Doncaster races.  They would alight at Bawtry, being greeted with the usual enthusiasm, and proceed by road to the racecourse.

It was the junction of the Bawtry to Haxey railway line, a freight only line to Misson and Haxey, which opened in 1912 and the remaining section to Misson closed in 1964.

The station closed to regular passenger services in 1958 but occasional special trains served the station until the mid-1960s.

Present day 
The buildings and platforms have been swept away but a couple of goods yard buildings are now houses.

References 

"South Yorkshire Railway Stations on old postcards" by Norman Ellis. Reflections of a Bygone Age.   
 Report to Doncaster Borough Council on the planning strategy of preserving access and opening stations on rail routes in the borough. (The Star, Saturday, 14 February 2009)

External links
 Bawtry station on navigable 1955 O. S. map

Disused railway stations in Doncaster
Former Great Northern Railway stations
Railway stations in Great Britain opened in 1849
Railway stations in Great Britain closed in 1958
Bawtry
1849 establishments in England